Poland first participated at the Olympic Games in 1924, and has sent athletes to compete in every Summer Olympic Games since then, except for the 1984 Games, when they were part of the Soviet-led boycott of the 1984 Summer Olympics. Poland has also participated in every Winter Olympic Games.

Polish athletes have won a total of 321 medals (79 gold, 96 silver, 146 bronze) in 19 different summer and 5 different winter sports. Poland is the second most successful country in total medals (after Hungary) of those who have never hosted the Olympics. The nation's best overall performance at the Olympics occurred at the 1976 Summer Olympics in Montreal with the country's athletes winning 7 gold, 6 silver and 13 bronze medals finishing sixth in the medal table.

Its most successful teams have been football and volleyball. Poland ranks fifth all-time in modern pentathlon, seventh in athletics, and has also been successful in weightlifting, martial arts and nordic skiing.

The National Olympic Committee for Poland is the Polish Olympic Committee (Polish: Polski Komitet Olimpijski, PKOl). The entity was created in 1918 and recognized in 1919.

History 
Poland officially made its debut at the Olympics in 1924, however, Polish athletes did participate in earlier editions of the Olympic Games representing other nations. The first ever Olympic medal for Poland (silver) was won by track cyclists in team pursuit Franciszek Szymczyk, Jan Lazarski, Józef Lange and Tomasz Stankiewicz at the 1924 Summer Olympics in Paris while the first gold medal for Poland was won by discus thrower Halina Konopacka at the 1928 Summer Olympics in Amsterdam. The first Polish sportsperson who individually won two Olympic medals (silver and bronze) was equestrian Michał Antoniewicz in 1928.

Poland won the largest number of medals (32) at the 1980 Summer Olympics in Moscow. Poland boycotted the next Summer Olympic Games in Los Angeles alongside another 13 Eastern Bloc countries in response to the American-led boycott of the 1980 Summer Olympics in Moscow in protest of the Soviet invasion of Afghanistan. The most successful Polish Olympian to date is Irena Szewińska with seven Olympic medals altogether. With four gold medals, Robert Korzeniowski is the most successful Polish Olympian in terms of the number of gold medals.

Medal tables

Medals by Summer Games

Medals by Winter Games

Medals by summer sport

Medals by winter sport

Multiple medallists

Flag bearers

  – Aleksandra Król (snowboarding) and Zbigniew Bródka (speed skating)
  – Paweł Korzeniowski (swimming), Maja Włoszczowska (mountain biking)
  – Zbigniew Bródka (speed skating)
  – Karol Bielecki (handball)
  – Dawid Kupczyk (bobsleigh)
  – Agnieszka Radwańska (tennis)
  – Konrad Niedźwiedzki (speed skating)
  – Marek Twardowski (canoe racing)
  – Paulina Ligocka (snowboarding)
  – Bartosz Kizierowski (swimming)
  – Mariusz Siudek (figure skating)
  – Andrzej Wroński (wrestling)
  – Jan Ziemianin (biathlon)
  – Rafał Szukała (swimming)
  – Tomasz Sikora (biathlon)
  – Waldemar Legień (judo)
  – Henryk Gruth (ice hockey)
  – Bogdan Daras (wrestling)
  – Henryk Gruth (ice hockey)
  – Józef Łuszczek (cross-country skiing)
  – Czesław Kwieciński (wrestling)
  – Józef Łuszczek (cross-country skiing)
  – Grzegorz Śledziewski (canoe racing)
  – Wojciech Truchan (biathlon)
  – Waldemar Baszanowski (weightlifting)
  – Andrzej Bachleda (alpine skiing)
  – Waldemar Baszanowski (weightlifting)
  – Stanisław Szczepaniak (biathlon)
  – Waldemar Baszanowski (weightlifting)
  – Jerzy Wojnar (luge)
  – Teodor Kocerka (rowing)
  – Józef Karpiel (Nordic combined/cross-country skiing)
  – Tadeusz Rut (athletics)
  – Tadeusz Kwapień (cross-country skiing)
  – Teodor Kocerka (rowing)
  – Stanisław Marusarz (ski jumping)
  – Mieczysław Łomowski (athletics)
  – Stanisław Marusarz (ski jumping)
  – Klemens Biniakowski (athletics)
  – Bronisław Czech (ski jumping/Nordic combined/Alpine skiing)
  – Janusz Ślązak (rowing)
  – Józef Stogowski (ice hockey)
  – Marian Cieniewski (wrestling)
  – Andrzej Krzeptowski I (ski jumping/Nordic combined)
  – Sławosz Szydłowski (athletics)
  – Kazimierz Smogorzewski (sports journalist)

See also 
 :Category:Olympic competitors for Poland
 Poland at the Paralympics

External links

References